The Jane Addams Trail is a  long rail trail in Stephenson County, Illinois.

Jane Addams, the trail's namesake, was born in Stephenson County.  The trail's endpoints are Freeport, Illinois and the Illinois-Wisconsin state line, where it becomes the Badger State Trail.  The trail passes through Orangeville and is one segment of the  Grand Illinois Trail.

External links
 Jane Addams Trail Official Website

Rail trails in Illinois
Stephenson County, Illinois